The 2016 Zhuhai ITF Women's Pro Circuit was a professional tennis tournament played on outdoor hard courts. It was the 2nd edition of the tournament and part of the 2016 ITF Women's Circuit, offering a total of $50,000 in prize money. It took place at the Hengqin International Tennis Center in Zhuhai, China, on 12–18 September 2016.

Singles main draw entrants

Seeds 

 1 Rankings as of 29 August 2016.

Other entrants 
The following player received a wildcard into the singles main draw:
  Cao Siqi
  Wang Yan
  You Xiaodi
  Zhang Ying

The following players received entry from the qualifying draw:
  Gao Xinyu
  Vera Lapko
  Noppawan Lertcheewakarn
  Yuuki Tanaka

Champions

Singles

 Olga Govortsova def.  İpek Soylu, 6–1, 6–2

Doubles

 Ankita Raina /  Emily Webley-Smith def.  Guo Hanyu /  Jiang Xinyu, 6–4, 6–4

External links 
 2016 Zhuhai ITF Women's Pro Circuit at ITFtennis.com

2016 Zhuhai ITF
2016 ITF Women's Circuit
2016 in Chinese tennis